Billbergia cardenasii is a species of flowering plant in the genus Billbergia. This species is endemic to Bolivia. It has clear yellow petals and equal sepals.

References 

cardenasii
Flora of Bolivia